Margarochroma is a genus of moths of the family Crambidae.

Species
Margarochroma fuscalis Hampson, 1907
Margarochroma pictalis Warren, 1896

References

Natural History Museum Lepidoptera genus database

Acentropinae
Crambidae genera
Taxa named by William Warren (entomologist)